Walker's Station was a stage stand on the old Butterfield Overland Mail route in Indian Territory. It was located at the old Choctaw Agency in Skullyville, in what is now Le Flore County, Oklahoma. The station was named for Tandy Walker, Choctaw chief, and later, Governor of the Choctaw Nation. The old Choctaw Agency building was his residence.

Walker's Station was added to the National Register of Historic Places (#72001074) in 1972.

References

Buildings and structures in Le Flore County, Oklahoma
Stagecoach stations on the National Register of Historic Places in Oklahoma
Butterfield Overland Mail in Indian Territory
National Register of Historic Places in Le Flore County, Oklahoma
Stagecoach stations in Oklahoma